Line 17 may refer to:

China
 Line 17 (Beijing Subway)
 Line 17 (Chengdu Metro)
 Line 17 (Shanghai Metro)
 Line 17 (Shenzhen Metro) (planned)
 Line 17 (Zhengzhou Metro) (under construction)

Other countries
 Line 17 (Stockholm Metro), a Green line, Sweden
 Line 17 (Zürich), or Bremgarten–Dietikon railway line, Switzerland
 Paris Métro Line 17, France
 Line 17, serving the Sinsen Line of the Oslo Tramway, Norway